Paul Haines may refer to:

Paul Haines (fiction writer) (1970–2012), New Zealand-born horror and speculative fiction writer
Paul Haines (poet) (1933–2003), Canadian-American avant-garde and jazz poet

See also
Paul Haynes (disambiguation)